Religious emblems programs also called religious recognition programs are awards set up by some religious organizations for members of various youth organizations.

United States 

In the United States, there are more than thirty different religious emblems, each representing a different faith. A diverse selection of religious groups participate in the program, including denominations of Christianity and other Abrahamic religions, the Dharmic religions and Zoroastrianism. The religious emblems are "created by the various religious groups to encourage youth to grow stronger in their faith. The religious groups, not the youth organizations, have created the emblem programs themselves. Each religious organization develops and administers its own program." Many religious groups  have  separate programs for different age levels within scouting, and some offer different programs or emblems for boys and girls.  Some offer different programs or emblems for each youth organization.

The youth organizations do not run the programs, and youth organization leaders do not guide the youths through the program unless they also are the youth's religious leader or mentor.  The youth organizations can choose to decide whether the emblems of a particular religious program will be worn on the youth organization's uniforms.

Once a youth has completed the program of their religion, they are usually presented with the emblem at a ceremony organized by their religious institution or the youth organization.  The emblem is generally in the form of a medal, pin, or patch.  Depending on the youth organization, the emblem can be worn only on formal or religious occasions, or may be worn all the time.

Many of the religions also have awards for adult members; however, adult members are generally nominated by others for service to the religion within Scouting.  A few religious organizations offer awards for adults who serve as leaders or mentors for youth earning the awards.  In most cases, adults do not have a formal program to complete to earn an award.

In the United States many, although not all, religious organizations with programs contract with the Programs of Religious Activities with Youth (P.R.A.Y.) business office to handle the mechanics of order processing.  P.R.A.Y. itself develops and administers the God and Country program aimed at Protestant youth.  P.R.A.Y. also promotes the religious emblems programs in general for all religions approved for scouting, both through lists and brochures distributed on the website and to scouting organizations, and through rotational segment patch programs designed to promote religious awards.

Boy Scouts of America 

A variety of religious emblems programs approved by the Boy Scouts of America (BSA) are designed to encourage youth to learn about their faith and to recognize adults who provide significant service to youth in a religious environment. Under the promise of BSA, scout aim to be reverent.

Boy Scouts who complete approved programs (workshops, with books fill in along with their denomination faith) . Boy scouts upon completion will earn a purple knot that it may also wear as the universal religious emblem knot insignia on the Scout uniform at all times. Participation in a program is not required, but encouraged although doing so is one method of completing some requirements for some Scout ranks.
For instance Bronze award in Venturing Scouts and the TRUST MEDAL in Venturing as well.

To promote religious awards within BSA, P.R.A.Y. offers a "Duty to God" rotational segment patch program for scouts and adults who attend or make a presentation about religious awards, then make a personal commitment to fulfill their "duty to God".  This program is similar to the "To Serve God" GSUSA and "Love God" AHG programs.

Girl Scouts of the USA 

In the Girl Scouts of the USA (GSUSA) participation in a religious emblem program is optional and only a small percentage of Girl Scouts earn them.  P.R.A.Y. has a list of religious emblems approved for Girl Scouts, but it is not considered exhaustive.

Camp Fire 

In Camp Fire participation in a religious emblem program is optional.  P.R.A.Y. has a list of religious emblems approved for Camp Fire members, but it is not considered exhaustive.

American Heritage Girls 

As a Christian organization, the American Heritage Girls (AHG) approves of the Protestant God and Country program from P.R.A.Y., Members of Churches of Christ for Scouting (MCCS), as well as the Catholic programs available from the National Federation for Catholic Youth Ministry (N.F.C.Y.M.) and the Eastern Orthodox Program from P.R.A.Y approved by the Eastern Orthodox Committee on Scouting.  Recognitions from other organizations, denominations, or religions are not approved for use with the organization.

To promote religious awards within AHG, P.R.A.Y. offers a "Love God" rotational segment patch program for girl scouts and adults who memorize the Biblical verses Mark 12:29-31, attend or make a presentation about religious awards, then make a personal commitment to "love God".  This program is similar to the "Duty to God" BSA and "To Serve God" GSUSA programs.

Canada 
Scouts Canada and Girl Guides of Canada offer the Religion in Life badge.  Different faiths develop their own programs which are approved by Scouts Canada (which also administers the program for Girl Guides of Canada).

Each program has multiple age stages and a badge can be earned for each stage with the border color indicating the stage.  The emblem on the badge indicates which faith.
 Stage 1 - Ages 7–9 - yellow border
 Stage 2 - Ages 10–12 - green border
 Stage 3 - Ages 13–15 - blue border
 Stage 4 - Ages 15 and up - red border
 Stage 5 - adult - purple border

Currently recognized programs are
 Anglican Church of Canada
 Apostolic Church of the Pentecost
 Canadian Baptist Ministries
 Canadian Conference of the Mennonite Brethren Churches
 Canadian Armed Forces (Protestant)
 Christian Church (Disciples of Christ)
 Christian Science
 Church of the Nazarene
 Congregational Christian Church of Canada
 Eastern Orthodox Church
 Evangelical Church of Canada
 Free Methodist Church of Canada
 Lutheran Churches of Canada
 Moravian Church of Canada
 Orthodox Church
 Pentecostal Assemblies
 Polish National Catholic Church of Canada
 Presbyterian Church in Canada
 Religious Society of Friends (Quakers)
 Reorganized Church of Jesus Christ of Latter Day Saints
 Roman Catholic Church in Canada
 Salvation Army
 The Standard Church
 United Church of Canada
The above all have the same badge of a circle around a Greek alpha and omega. The following all have different badges.
 Bahá’í Faith - nine pointed star
 Buddhist Faith - wheel of the law
 Canadian Unitarian Council - flaming chalice
 Hindu - om
 Islam in Canada - Allah in Arabic above a crescent moon and star above Allah in English
 Jewish Religion - Menorah
 Sikh - Khanda
 Zoroastrianism - Fravashi

See also 

 Religion in Scouting

Footnotes

Further Information 
 Programs of Religious Activities with Youth.  Also known as P.R.A.Y..  The administrator of a set of Protestant religious programs but their business office is also a clearing house on info about the Religious Emblems Programs in the United States in general.
 Boy Scouts of America info on the Religious Emblems Programs
 Policy of the Boy Scouts of America Pertaining to Recognitions Granted by Churches, Synagogues, Temples, Mosques and Other Religious Organizations
 Friends Committee on Scouting
 National Catholic Committee for Girl Scouts and Camp Fire  and National Catholic Committee on Scouting (Boy Scouts)
 National Lutheran Association on Scouting
 Eastern Orthodox Committee on Scouting
 National Jewish Committee on Scouting (Boy Scouts) National Jewish Girl Scout Committee
 Baha'i Religious Emblem Program
 National Buddhist Committee on Scouting
 North American Hindu Association
 National Islamic Committee on Girl Scouting

References 

Scout and Guide awards
Religion and children
Religion-related awards